Martin Schneider is a German comedian, cabarettist and actor.

Martin Schneider may also refer to:

 Martin Schneider (footballer), German footballer 
 Martin Schneider (economist), German economist
 Martin Schneider (opera director), German opera director
 Martin Gotthard Schneider, German theologian, church musician, songwriter, and academic teacher